The 1954 Edmonton Eskimos finished in 1st place in the Western Interprovincial Football Union with an 11–5 record and won the 42nd Grey Cup, the first championship in franchise history.

Pre-season

Schedule

Regular season

Standings

Schedule

Playoffs

Grey Cup

References

Edmonton Elks seasons
Grey Cup championship seasons
N. J. Taylor Trophy championship seasons
Edmonton Eskimos
1954 Canadian football season by team